John Christopher Hinostroza Guzmán (born February 22, 1980 in Lima) is a Peruvian footballer who plays as a midfielder.

Honours

Club
Alianza Lima
 Torneo Clausura: 1999
Universidad San Martín
 Peruvian Primera División: 2007, 2008, 2010

References

External links 
 
 

1980 births
Living people
Footballers from Lima
Peruvian footballers
Peru international footballers
Club Alianza Lima footballers
Estudiantes de Medicina footballers
Unión Huaral footballers
Club Deportivo Universidad de San Martín de Porres players
Club Deportivo Universidad César Vallejo footballers
Peruvian Primera División players
Association football midfielders